The Hoosier Gym is a basketball gymnasium, museum, and community center located in Knightstown, Indiana. It is famous for being a filming location for the 1986 basketball movie Hoosiers, starring Gene Hackman and Dennis Hopper. The gym was the home court of the movie's Hickory Huskers. The facility has retained the same appearance as when the movie was filmed in 1985. The gym attracts 80,000 tourists to the town per year.

History

Initial construction 
In 1920, the Knightstown Community School had no gymnasium. Basketball games were held in Bell's Hall above Jolly's Drugstore and in the basement gym of the Presbyterian Church. 

In February 1921, a half-dozen Knightstown businessmen met to discuss the fact that Knightstown was lagging behind other towns in the development of children's athletic education. After much debate, a plan to build a "gymnasium and community house" was developed and approved. To help fund the new gym, they raised more than $14,400 in donations from more than 250 citizens and several local businesses.

Finally, on December 1, 1921, construction of the gym was completed.

Upon completion of the new construction, it became evident that additional funds would be needed for maintenance and custodial services, including heat and lighting. It wasn't long before arrangements were made for several professional basketball teams to play on the new floor, including the EmRoes, Michigan Rails, and Baltimore Orioles. The town even persuaded players from various colleges to compete against local teams.

Within four years, the school board made the final payment on the gymnasium and took full control of the building.

Additional construction 
As Knightstown grew, so did the demands for the gym. In 1936, the school board used local and federal Works Progress Administration funds to make major improvements. The project included an exterior facelift with a new front entrance and lobby, and the creation of basement dressing rooms. 

In 1952, the gym was expanded again. In order to accommodate the school's growing art, music, and science departments, three classrooms, a kitchen, and restrooms were added on the east end of the building.

Closure 
By 1966, the gym had become obsolete with the building of a new high school and gym. The Panthers of Knightstown played their last official regular-season basketball game at the gym that February. So after 45 years of serving the community and providing a place for its young people to grow and develop, the gym was closed. For the next 19 years, the old gym saw little use.

Hoosiers 

In 1985, interest in the gym increased when a film crew descended upon Knightstown, looking for a place to film Hoosiers. The movie told the story of the unique phenomenon known as Hoosier Hysteria — Indiana’s obsession with basketball. The gym provided the perfect setting. About one third of the film was filmed in the gym. As a result of the success of this film, the old Knightstown gymnasium came to be known as the Hoosier Gym.

Reopening 
By 1988, the gym faced possible demolition as the 112-year-old school next door, then serving as an elementary school, was replaced by a new school north of town. The old school became an apartment building. Two groups, Historic Knightstown and Historic Landmarks of Indiana, stepped forward to help preserve the gym. Now it hosts 80 high school basketball games a year. Additionally, each year the gym holds the Hoosiers Reunion All-Star Classic, where Indiana's best high school athletes play against each other, with the teams named "Hickory" and "Terhune," as in the movie.

References

External links
 The Historic Hoosier Gym

Knightstown, Indiana
Works Progress Administration in Indiana
Buildings and structures in Henry County, Indiana
Museums in Henry County, Indiana
Sports museums in Indiana